Diane M. Johnsen was a Judge of the Arizona Court of Appeals, Division One, having been appointed to the post in August 2006 by Governor Janet Napolitano. She retired in 2020.

Johnsen received her Bachelor of Arts summa cum laude from the University of Arizona in 1975. After working as a reporter for the Arizona Daily Star, Johnsen went on to receive her Juris Doctor in 1982 from Stanford Law School, where she had been an associate editor of the Stanford Law Review.

After leaving law school, Johnsen was a clerk to Ninth Circuit Court of Appeals Judge Benjamin Cushing Duniway.  She was a commercial litigation attorney at Munger, Tolles & Olson in Los Angeles, California from 1983 to 1985 and at Osborn Maledon in Phoenix, Arizona from 1985 to 2006.

Johnsen was a board member of the Arizona Center for Law in the Public Interest from 1993 to 2006 and the Children's Action Alliance from 2004 to 2006.

Publications
 "Building a Bench: A Close Look at State Appellate Courts Constructed by the Respective Methods of Judicial Selection", 53 San Diego L. Rev. 829 (2016).

References

External links
 Vacancy Announcement. Archived from the original on February 25, 2019.

Year of birth missing (living people)
1950s births
Living people
21st-century American judges
Arizona Democrats
Arizona state court judges
Lawyers from Phoenix, Arizona
People associated with Munger, Tolles & Olson
Stanford Law School alumni
University of Arizona alumni
21st-century American women judges